The 1953–54 Klass B season was the fourth season of the Klass B, the second level of ice hockey in the Soviet Union. Seven teams participated in the final tournament, and Dynamo Novosibirsk won the championship. Novosibirsk and Torpedo Gorky were promoted to the Soviet Championship League.

Final tournament

External links
 Season on hockeyarchives.info

2
Soviet Union
Ice hockey leagues in the Soviet Union